Khesht Masjed (also Romanized as Khesht-e Masjed; also known as Khachta-Mechet and Khesht Masjed Kooch Esfahan) is a village in Belesbeneh Rural District, Kuchesfahan District, Rasht County, Gilan Province, Iran. At the 2006 census, its population was 935, in 297 families.

References 

Populated places in Rasht County